Nakprasith School
is a co-educational school in Khlongmai, Samphran, Nakhon Pathom. It provides 4 levels of education: pre-kindergarten, kindergarten, elementary first or primary, and secondary or high school. It has an Intensive English Program (IEP) from kindergarten to secondary level, providing students with an immersive English learning environment. It has four learning plans for high school 4-6 (grades 10-12): Science-Mathematics, English-Mathematics, English-Chinese, and Vocational Certificate (accounting, business computer, marketing, home economics). 
It belongs to the foundation of Bang Chang Nuea Temple.

History
Nakprasith school was established on 20 August 1940 by Phrakru Palatphan Saeng-Sopha who was the ex-abbot of Bang Chang Nuea Temple in 1940. He collected money from the people around the area of the temple to build this school. The first building is hip-roofed and has 2 floors and 6 classrooms. Teaching commenced on 15 July 1941. At that time, this school had 125 students, 5 teachers and 1 building.

Presently, Nakprasith School has approximately 5,400 students, 10 classroom buildings, 132 classrooms, 232 teachers, 27 extra-teachers, and many alumni, according to the time of the school establishment, over 60 years. Moreover, there are other buildings such as a library room, language laboratory, computer laboratory, science laboratory, music room, swimming pool, etc…

Vision, identity, philosophy
 Vision: Encouraging Good Ethics, Strengthening Children's Education, *Living Happily
 Identity: Well Disciplined
 Philosophy: Excel Academically, Well Disciplined and Be Healthy
 Slogan: รักงาน ประสานใจ (Love Work & Join Heart)
 Song: Nakprasith March
 School Band: King of Nagas

Activity Days
Academic Day
Nak Sampan Day
Sport's Day
Bang Chang Nuea Temple Fair
Children's Day

External links
 

1940 establishments in Thailand
Buildings and structures in Nakhon Pathom province
Educational institutions established in 1940
Schools in Thailand